Antonio (Tony) Krsticevic  (born 13 June 1966) is an Australian politician, who served as the member for Carine in the Western Australian Legislative Assembly from the 2008 election to the 2021 election. He is a member of the Liberal Party.

Born in Zagreb, Croatia, Krsticevic emigrated to Australia at the age of three with his family a few years after his father established himself, and became a citizen at age 10. After completing a Bachelor of Business with a major in Accounting and Computing, he worked for 20 years at the Australian Taxation Office in Perth. He also served on the Ethnic Communities Council's management committee and was a founding member and the first chair of the Croatian Community Council, as well as coaching the local junior soccer team in Balcatta.

He joined the Liberal Party in 1995, in 2008 he was asked to nominate for Carine after the incumbent member, Katie Hodson-Thomas, announced her retirement.

His parliamentary maiden speech referred to his Catholic beliefs, and was identified by Amanda O'Brien of the Australian newspaper as part of a four-member "god squad" in WA politics.

After the 2017 election defeat of the Barnett Government he became a contender to lead the parliamentary Liberal party from opposition.

He was voted out at the 2021 state election with a 12.7% swing against him, being replaced with Labor's Paul Lilburne. Prior to that election, Carine was considered a safe Liberal seat and very unlikely to go to Labor.

In October 2021, Krsticevic was elected with a four-year term to the Coastal Ward of the City of Stirling council.

References

1966 births
Living people
Members of the Western Australian Legislative Assembly
Liberal Party of Australia members of the Parliament of Western Australia
Australian people of Croatian descent
21st-century Australian politicians
Western Australian local councillors